Karl Morgan Block (September 27, 1886 – September 20, 1958) was the fourth bishop of the Episcopal Diocese of California.

Early Life and Education
Block was born on September 27, 1886 in Washington, D.C., the son of Sigismund Joseph Block and Joanna Christine Linder. He earned a Bachelor of Arts from George Washington University in 1907, and later a Bachelor of Divinity from the Virginia Theological Seminary in 1910. He was awarded a number of honorary degrees; a Doctor of Divinity from Roanoke College in 1923, the University of the South in 1935, and the Virginia Theological Seminary in 1950, respectively; a Doctor of Laws from George Washington University in 1937; and a Doctor of Systematic Theology from the University of the Pacific in 1953.

Ordained Ministry
Ordained a deacon on May 22, 1910 and priest on December 18, 1910 by Bishop Alfred Harding of Washington, he initially served as chaplain at Woodberry Forest School between 1910 and 1913. Then in 1913 he accepted the post of rector of Grace Church in Haddonfield, New Jersey, where he remained until 1917. Between 1917 until 1918 he was a volunteer chaplain at Fort Dix. In 1918, he became rector of All Saints’ Church in Norristown, Pennsylvania, while in 1920 he moved to Roanoke, Virginia to be rector of St John’s Church. In 1926, he became rector of the Church of St Michael and St George in St. Louis, a post he retained until 1938.

Episcopacy
Block was elected Coadjutor Bishop of Kansas, however, he declined the election. On April 19, 1938 he was once more elected bishop, this time as Coadjutor Bishop of California and he accepted. He was consecrated as coadjutor bishop of California by Edward L. Parsons and co-consecrated by Benjamin D. Dagwell on September 29, 1938 in Grace Cathedral, San Francisco. He succeeded as diocesan on January 1, 1941. During his tenure the diocese experienced an increase in clergy, increased income, and novel building projects. Block died in office on September 20, 1958.

References

 The Living Church, February 8, 1936, p. 173.

1886 births
1958 deaths
Episcopal bishops of California
Religious leaders from Washington, D.C.
George Washington University alumni
Virginia Theological Seminary alumni